Kinga Czigány (born 17 February 1972) is a Hungarian sprint canoer who competed in the 1990s. Competing in two Summer Olympics, she won a gold medal in the K-4 500 m event at Barcelona in 1992.

Czigány also won five medals at the ICF Canoe Sprint World Championships with three silvers (K-2 500 m: 1993, 1994; K-4 500 m: 1994) and two bronzes (K-4 500 m: 1993, 1995).

Awards
   Order of Merit of the Republic of Hungary – Small Cross (1992)
 Hungarian kayaker of the Year (2): 1992, 1993
 Member of the Hungarian team of year (with Rita Kőbán, Erika Mészáros, Éva Dónusz): 1992

References

1972 births
Canoeists at the 1992 Summer Olympics
Canoeists at the 1996 Summer Olympics
Hungarian female canoeists
Living people
Olympic canoeists of Hungary
Olympic gold medalists for Hungary
Olympic medalists in canoeing
ICF Canoe Sprint World Championships medalists in kayak
Medalists at the 1992 Summer Olympics
20th-century Hungarian women